The hybrid elm cultivar Ulmus × hollandica 'Dumont'  was a very vigorous elm raised from a tree discovered by a gardener on the estate of M. Dumont at Tournay, Belgium, c. 1865.

Description
The tree had a straight trunk and a narrow regular, pyramidal crown, Elwes likening it to Wheatley Elm in habit. The leaves were somewhat smaller than those of 'Belgica'.

Pests and diseases
'Dumont' was very susceptible to Dutch elm disease.

Cultivation
 
No specimens are known to survive. The tree was once a popular choice for street planting in Belgium and France, notably at Ypres, where Henry collected a specimen for Kew Gardens in 1912, and at Versailles (town, not palace), where it was supplied by Moser's nursery and planted in "peculiar clipped avenues". Early 20th-century photographs of the Place Barascude and Avenue Thiers, Versailles, show Wheatley-like elms, some clipped, and pruned avenues by Moser's nursery. An U. campestris Dumont, "a vigorous grower" with "large leaves", appeared in the 1909 catalogue of the Bobbink and Atkins nursery, Rutherford, New Jersey. The Hesse Nursery of Weener, Germany, marketed an Ulmus latifolia Dumont in the 1930s.

Synonymy
Ulmus campestris var. Dumontii: Mottet  in Nicholson  & Mottet's Dictionnaire pratique d'horticulture et de jardinage 5: 383, 1898, and by Krüssmann  in Handb, Laubgeh. 2: 537, 1962.
Ulmus 'De Dumont': Plant Buyer's Guide, ed. 6. 286, 1958.

References

External links
 Ypres specimen (Augustine Henry, 1912)
 Long shoot, possibly juvenile; U. hollandica Mill. 'Dumonti'; Poort Bulten Arboretum specimen, Den Haag (1931)  
 Long shoot, possibly juvenile; U. hollandica Mill. 'Dumontii' Rehd.; Den Haag specimen (1932)

Dutch elm cultivar
Ulmus articles missing images
Ulmus
Missing elm cultivars